A 12-volt outlet is any electrical outlet that outputs 12 volts and may refer to:

Cigar lighter receptacle, the most famous example
Molex connector, used for connecting hard drives and optical drives, and sometimes for powering flash memory surrogate hard drive modules
Trailer lighting connector, has multiple prongs with 12 volts